André II Mvizi a Luken (1798–1842) was the first child of the Manikongo Garcia V Nkanga Mvemba and his third wife, Lusana Mbandu, a princess regent Luunda. After marriage, she gave a coup in Luunda Empire, and joined the Kongo Empire, thus narrowing the circle imperial Africa, taking all what is now the Democratic Republic of Congo. Eventually André was overthrown by Henrique III, though he survived but never regained the throne.

References

Manikongo of Kongo
1798 births
1842 deaths